Pawan Gupta is an Indian biotechnologist, immunobiologist, and cell biologist.

Pawan Gupta may also refer to:

 Pawan Gupta (wushu), Indian sanda fighter
 Pawan Gupta (Nirbhaya Case), executed for rape and murder
 Pawan Gupta, founder of Connect2India
 Pawan Gupta, British politician; see 2006 Brent London Borough Council election